The National Admissions Test for Law, or LNAT, is an admissions aptitude test that was adopted in 2004 by eight UK university law programmes as an admissions requirement for home applicants. The test was established at the leading urgency of Oxford University as an answer to the problem facing universities trying to select from an increasingly competitive pool with similarly high A-levels. With effect from its second year, the LNAT is required for UK and overseas applicants alike. There are now nine participating law schools and hundreds of test centres worldwide.

Format
The LNAT is 135 minutes long and consists of two sections. The test taker is allotted 40 minutes to complete the essay and 95 minutes to answer 42 multiple-choice questions aimed at measuring reading comprehension and logical reasoning skills. The reading portion contains twelve short passages, with three or four questions about each passage. The questions typically ask for terms and arguments from the reading to be defined by inference. The essay portion is 40 minutes long and involves the candidate answering one of three available essay questions. The questions are generally open-ended prompts that can focus on any one of a wide variety of issues.

The reading section is scored out of 42 and the essays are individually marked by proctors at the respective universities.

The universities currently using the LNAT are:

University of Bristol
Durham University
University of Glasgow
King's College London
University of Nottingham
University of Oxford
SOAS, University of London (for students with BTEC qualifications)
University College London
NUI Maynooth (mature entry only)
IE University, Spain
Singapore University of Social Sciences, Singapore
 London School of Economics
 University of Cambridge (2022 applicants onwards)

Results
The LNAT was first administered on 3 November 2004. The average score for the reading portion was 13.16 out of 24. Four test-takers received a 21 out of 24, the highest score achieved; the lowest score achieved by the 4,345 candidates was 3. Men performed slightly better than women on the multiple-choice portion, scoring 13.37 and 13.02 on average, respectively. A University of Bristol report on the scores expressed dissatisfaction with the ability of law candidates to develop "reasoned arguments". Men and women scored approximately equally to each other, in contrast to the distribution of A grades in A-level law, which were awarded to 19.3% of women and only 14.1% of men.

The LNAT consortium also reported statistically insignificant differences in scores between state and independent students. Research conducted by the University of Bristol concluded: "the impact of the Lnat both in general and on specific supposedly sensitive widening participation groups has been negligible".

Average scores

Entrants' mean average scores for the multiple choice element of the test in each year are as follows:

References

External links

Sample LNAT questions from the Guardian
Advice on taking the LNAT Oxford University Press website
"The secret of winning a place to study law" by Alex Aldridge in The Guardian 

2004 introductions
Standardized tests for Law
Legal profession exams
Entrance examinations
Legal education in the United Kingdom
University of Oxford examinations